Buzzoven (typeset Buzzov•en) is an American heavy metal band from Salisbury, North Carolina, formed in 1990. The band was known for being one of the founders of the sludge genre along with NOLA's Eyehategod and Acid Bath, and also for their out-of-control and violent live shows. The band in its early days toured heavily around the United States and built up a cult following leading up to the release of their debut album, To a Frown (1993), which caught the attention of Roadrunner Records, who released the band's second album Sore (1994). The band was dropped by Roadrunner, and from then on have gone through several periods of being split-up and reformed, with the only constant member having been Kirk Fisher. In 2018, the band toured the Southern US as one of the opening acts for Eyehategod.

Band members

Current members
Kirk Fisher – vocals, guitar
t.roy – bass guitar
Ashley- drums

Former members 
Fred Hutch – bass (1990–1991)
Scott Majors – drums (1990–1992)
Brian Hill – bass (1991–1995)
Ashley Williamson – drums (1992–1995)
Buddy Apostolis – guitars (1994; died 2002)
Dennis Woolard – guitars (1992–1993)
Johnny Brito – guitars (1994–1995)
Craig Baker – guitars (1997–1998)
Dave Collins – bass (1997–1999; 2010)
Ramsey Simple – drums (1997–1999; 2010)

Live musicians 
David "Mohawk" Miranda – guitars
Mykull Davidson – samples (1992–1996)
T.roy Sourvein – samples, vocals (1996–1999)

Discography

Albums and EPs

Singles

References

External links

Buzzov*en at Encyclopedia Metallum
Buzzov*en at Spirit of Metal

American sludge metal musical groups
Heavy metal musical groups from North Carolina
American thrash metal musical groups
Roadrunner Records artists
Musical groups established in 1989
Musical groups disestablished in 2001
American musical trios
Alternative Tentacles artists